"Don't Be a Dropout" is a song written by Burt Jones and recorded by James Brown. It was Brown's first attempt at a socially conscious song, encouraging teenagers to stay in school. Released as a single in 1966, it charted #4 R&B and #50 Pop. It also appeared on the album Sings Raw Soul. Bobby Byrd, Vicki Anderson, and The Jewels contribute backing vocals. The song led to Brown meeting with Vice President Hubert Humphrey, who had been working on a stay-in-school program of his own.

An unedited version of the original recording of "Don't Be a Dropout" is included on the 1991 box set Star Time.

References

James Brown songs
1966 singles
1966 songs
Songs about school
King Records (United States) singles